Treaty of Fort Laramie may refer to:

Treaty of Fort Laramie (1851)
Treaty of Fort Laramie (1868)